Ermine Glacier is located on north slopes of Glacier Peak in the U.S. state of Washington. As is true with all the glaciers found on Glacier Peak, Ermine Glacier is retreating. From the end of the Little Ice Age to the mid-1950s, Ermine Glacier experienced a general retreat upslope, followed by an advance during a cooler and wetter period until the mid-1970s. However, between 1992 and 2005, Ermine Glacier again retreated .

See also
List of glaciers in the United States

References

Glaciers of Glacier Peak
Glaciers of Washington (state)